This is a list of universities where instruction is given through the language of Urdu.

 Dr. Abdul Haq Urdu University, a bi-lingual university located in India.
 Federal Urdu University, a public research university located in Pakistan.
 Maulana Azad National Urdu University, a Central University in India named after India's first Minister of Education.
 Osmania University, a public state university and one of the largest university systems in India.

References

Urdu
Universities and colleges in Pakistan
Urdu